Charles Édouard Boutibonne (Budapest, 8 July 1816 – Wilderswil, 7 February 1897) was a French painter of the academic classicism school.

He was born to French parents in Hungary. As a 22-year-old he painted a portrait of Liszt. He was a student of Franz Winterhalter.

Gallery

References

19th-century French painters
French male painters
1816 births
1897 deaths
Academic art
19th-century French male artists